Baduria Assembly constituency is an assembly constituency in North 24 Parganas district in the Indian state of West Bengal.

Overview
As per orders of the Delimitation Commission, No. 99 Baduria Assembly constituency is composed of the following: Baduria municipality, and Aturia, Bagjola, Bajitpur, Chandipur, Chhatra, South Jadurhati, North Jadurhati, Jagannathpur, Jasikati Atghara, Nayabastia Milani, Raghunathpur and Sayesta Nagar II gram panchayats of Baduria community development block.

Baduria Assembly constituency is part of No. 18 Basirhat (Lok Sabha constituency).

Members of Legislative Assembly

Election results

2021

In the 2021 elections, Abdur Rahim Quazi of AITC defeated his nearest rival Sukalyan Baidya of BJP.

2016

In the 2016 elections, Abdur Rahim Quazi of Indian National Congress defeated his nearest rival Amir Ali of All India Trinamool Congress

2011
In the 2011 election, Quazi Abdul Ghaffar of Congress defeated his nearest rival Md. Selim Gayen of CPI(M).

.# Swing calculated on Congress+Trinamool Congress vote percentages taken together in 2006.

1977-2006
In the 2006 state assembly elections, Mohammad Shelim of CPI(M) won the Baduria assembly seat defeating his nearest rival Abdul Gaffar Kazi of Congress. Contests in most years were multi cornered but only winners and runners are being mentioned. Abdul Gaffar Kazi of Congress defeated Sambhu Biswas of CPI(M) in 2001 and Mohammad Shelim of CPI(M) in 1996 and 1991. In 1987, the result was in favour of Mohammad Shelim when Abdul Gaffar Kazi had lost. In 1982, Abdul Gaffar Kazi had won against CPI(M) candidate Mustafa Bin Quasem, who had won in 1977 against Zulfiqar Ali of Congress.

1957-1972
Quazi Abdul Gaffar of Congress won in 1972 and 1971. Mir Abdus Sayeed of CPI(M) won in 1969. Quazi Abdul Gaffar of Congress won in 1967. Md. Ziaul Haque of Congress won in 1962 and 1957. Prior to that the Baduria constituency was not there.

References

Assembly constituencies of West Bengal
Politics of North 24 Parganas district
1957 establishments in West Bengal
Constituencies established in 1957